The 2023 New York City FC season is the club's ninth season in Major League Soccer, the top division of soccer in the United States. The club will split its home games between Yankee Stadium and Citi Field, and began play against Nashville SC on February 25, 2023.

Player movement

In

Out

Current roster

Competitions

Preseason

Major League Soccer

League tables

Eastern Conference

Overall

Match results

Leagues Cup 

The Leagues Cup will take place from July 21 to August 19. New York City FC will enter in the group stage as a seeded team, based on the 2022 Major League Soccer standings.

East 3

U.S. Open Cup 

New York City FC will enter the Open Cup in the Round of 32, based on the 2022 Major League Soccer standings.

References

2023
2023 Major League Soccer season
New York City FC